Alfred Robert "Dad" Clark (July 16, 1873 – July 26, 1956) was a professional baseball player. Clark played part of one season in Major League Baseball for the Chicago Orphans in 1902. He played in 12 games, collecting 8 hits in 43 at-bats, totaling a  batting average. Along with his nickname "Dad", Clark also was known as "Fred", a shortened version of Alfred.

External links

Major League Baseball first basemen
Chicago Orphans players
Ogden (minor league baseball) players
Kansas City Blue Stockings players
Peoria Distillers players
Helena Senators players
Los Angeles (minor league baseball) players
Salt Lake City Elders players
Bellingham Gillnetters players
Portland Giants players
Shreveport Pirates (baseball) players
Pueblo Indians players
Burlington Pathfinders players
Monmouth Browns players
St. Joseph Drummers players
Boise Irrigators players
Minor league baseball managers
Baseball players from California
1873 births
1956 deaths